Van Petten is an unincorporated community in Lee County, Illinois, United States.

History
The community is named for A. G. Van Petten, the original owner of the town site.  A post office called Van Petten was established in 1901 and remained in operation for 30 years. The population of the town in 2013 was 2.  The town is owned and operated by Dave and Babe Brandon

References

Unincorporated communities in Lee County, Illinois
Unincorporated communities in Illinois